Lise Baldwin (born May 26, 1970) is a Canadian actress and model currently residing in New Zealand.  She is also a public speaker on disability issues.

Film roles
 Broken Hallelujah(2009) - Sarah
 The Raffle (1994) - Beauty Entrant

Television roles
 Power Rangers: Jungle Fury (2008) – TV Reporter (2 episodes)

Short film roles
 Operator (2011) - Abigail
 Munted (2010) - Brooke
 The Therapy Session (2009) - The 60s Diva
 In the Privacy of My Room (2009) - Mum
 Tea & Biscuits (2009) - Mother
 Nature, Nurture, Intrinsic (2009) - Joanne
 The Minute Men (2008)- Dr. Kerry Post
 The Heist – Director - Campbell Cooley (2008) – Mother
 The Singing Surgeon (2007) - Nurse Barbie
 The Agent (2006) - Suzanne
 Down To Zero (1993) - Feather
 Uncle Joseph (1993) - Dr. Rafington

Other
 Weeds Promo DVD (2007) – Voiceover & Live Performance
 Numerous TVCs - Coldwell Banker; Telecom; The Warehouse; CMC Markets; KFC; Liquorland; etc.
 Various Presenting roles - Live and for TV

External links
 https://www.youtube.com/watch?v=2ap09ev1bDo
 

1970 births
Living people
Canadian film actresses